ROPS (Runway Overrun Prevention System) is a technology used in the Airbus A350 XWB aircraft, which is designed to prevent the overshooting of the runway as the plane is landing.

Airbus tested the system at Rovaniemi Airport in Finland during the winter of 2016.

References

A350